Afsharlu (also Romanized as Afshārlū and Afshār Loo; also known as Afshār and Aūshārle) is a village in Qeshlaqat-e Afshar Rural District, Afshar District, Khodabandeh County, Zanjan Province, Iran. At the 2006 census, its population was 33, in 7 families.

References 

Populated places in Khodabandeh County